Erald Hyseni (born 12 November 1999) is an Albanian footballer who plays as a midfielder for KF Besa Kavajë in the Kategoria e Parë.

Career

Tomori Berat
A graduate of the club's youth academy, Hyseni made his competitive debut for the club on 28 September 2016, coming on as a halftime substitute for Xhuljano Serdari in a 3-0 Cup defeat to Kukësi. He made his league debut for the club later that season, replacing Aldrit Oshafi in a 2–0 away defeat to Bylis in March 2017.

References

External links
 

1999 births
Living people
FK Tomori Berat players
Luftëtari Gjirokastër players
KF Besa Kavajë players
Kategoria e Parë players
Kategoria Superiore players
Albanian footballers
Association football midfielders